The New Republic is an American magazine of commentary on politics, contemporary culture, and the arts. Founded in 1914 by several leaders of the progressive movement, it attempted to find a balance between "a liberalism centered in humanitarian and moral passion and one based in an ethos of scientific analysis". Through the 1980s and 1990s, the magazine incorporated elements of the Third Way and conservatism. 

In 2014, two years after Facebook co-founder Chris Hughes purchased the magazine, he ousted its editor and attempted to remake its format, operations, and partisan stances, provoking the resignation of the majority of its editors and writers. In early 2016, Hughes announced he was putting the magazine up for sale, indicating the need for "new vision and leadership". The magazine was sold in February 2016 to Win McCormack, under whom the publication has returned to a more progressive stance. A weekly or near-weekly for most of its history, the magazine currently publishes ten issues per year.

Political views 

In its current incarnation, The New Republic has been unambiguously to the political left and is often critical of the Democratic Party establishment and strongly in favor of universal health care. In The American Conservative, Telly Davidson wrote that "its love letters to the Bernie Bro and Millennial Marxist movements and its attacks on Hillary and the Democratic establishment from the left, instead of from the right, bring back memories of its decidedly radical days in the '30s and '40s". In May 2019, The New Republic published a roundtable on socialism where three of four contributions were favorable, while the owner and editor-in-chief, Win McCormack, wrote a more dismissive piece.

In February 2019, staff writer Alex Shephard wrote that "it doesn't make political sense to put bumpers on hypothetical policies, which dampens voter enthusiasm. Pragmatism doesn't track as a legislative argument, either". In June 2019, staff writer Alex Pareene wrote: "All the while, Democratic leaders continue to campaign and govern from a crouched, defensive position even after they win power. They have bought into the central ideological proposition, peddled by apparatchiks and consultants aligned with the conservative movement, that America is an incorrigible 'center-right' nation, and they have precious little strategy or inclination to move that consensus leftward—to fight, in other words, to change the national consensus; the sort of activity that was once understood as 'politics'".

History

Early years 

The New Republic was founded by Herbert Croly, Walter Lippmann, and Walter Weyl through the financial backing of heiress Dorothy Payne Whitney and her husband, Willard Straight, who maintained majority ownership. The magazine's first issue was published on November 7, 1914. The magazine's politics were liberal and progressive, and as such concerned with coping with the great changes brought about by middle-class reform efforts designed to remedy the weaknesses in America's changing economy and society. The magazine is widely considered important in changing the character of liberalism in the direction of governmental interventionism, both foreign and domestic. The most important of them was the emergence of the U.S. as a great power on the international scene. In 1917, TNR urged America's entry into the Great War on the side of the Allies.

One consequence of the war was the Russian Revolution of 1917. During the interwar years, the magazine was generally positive in its assessment of the Soviet Union and Joseph Stalin. However, the magazine changed its position after the Cold War began in 1947, and in 1948, its leftist editor, Henry A. Wallace, departed to run for president on the Progressive ticket. After Wallace, the magazine moved toward positions more typical of mainstream American liberalism. Throughout the 1950s, the publication was critical of both Soviet foreign policy and domestic anticommunism, particularly McCarthyism. During the 1960s, the magazine opposed the Vietnam War but also often criticized the New Left.

Until the late 1960s, the magazine had a certain "cachet as the voice of re-invigorated liberalism," in the opinion of the commentator Eric Alterman, who has criticized the magazine's politics from the left. That cachet, Alterman wrote, "was perhaps best illustrated when the dashing, young President Kennedy had been photographed boarding Air Force One holding a copy."

Peretz ownership and eventual editorship, 1974–1979 

In March 1974, the magazine was purchased for $380,000 by Martin Peretz, a lecturer at Harvard University, from Gilbert A. Harrison. Peretz was a veteran of the New Left but had broken with the movement over its support of various Third World liberationist movements, particularly the Palestine Liberation Organization. Harrison continued editing the magazine and expected Peretz to let him continue running the magazine for three years. However, by 1975, when Peretz became annoyed at having his own articles rejected for publication while he was pouring money into the magazine to cover its losses, he fired Harrison. Much of the staff, including Walter Pincus, Stanley Karnow, and Doris Grumbach, was fired or quit and were replaced largely by recent Harvard graduates, who lacked journalistic experience. Peretz became the editor and served in that post until 1979. In 1980, it endorsed the moderate Republican John B. Anderson, who ran as an independent, rather than the Democratic incumbent Jimmy Carter. As other editors were appointed, Peretz remained editor-in-chief until 2012.

Kinsley and Hertzberg editorships, 1979–1991 

Michael Kinsley, a neoliberal, was editor (1979–1981, 1985–1989), alternating twice with the more leftleaning Hendrik Hertzberg (1981–1985; 1989–1991). Kinsley was only 28 years old when he first became editor and was still attending law school.

Writers for the magazine during this era included the neoliberals Mickey Kaus and Jacob Weisberg, along with Charles Krauthammer, Fred Barnes, Morton Kondracke, Sidney Blumenthal, Robert Kuttner, Ronald Steel, Michael Walzer, and Irving Howe.

In the 1980s, the magazine generally supported President Ronald Reagan's anticommunist foreign policy, including his provision of aid to the Nicaraguan Contras. The magazine's editors also supported both the Gulf War and the Iraq War and, reflecting its belief in the moral efficacy of American power, intervention in "humanitarian" crises, such as those in Bosnia and Herzegovina and Kosovo during the Yugoslav Wars.

It was widely considered a "must read" across the political spectrum. An article in Vanity Fair judged it "the smartest, most impudent weekly in the country" and the "most entertaining and intellectually agile magazine in the country." According to Alterman, the magazine's prose could sparkle and the contrasting views in its pages were "genuinely exciting." He added, "The magazine unarguably set the terms of debate for insider political elites during the Reagan era."

The magazine won the respect of many conservative opinion leaders. Twenty copies were sent by messenger to the Reagan White House each Thursday afternoon. Norman Podhoretz called the magazine "indispensable, " and George Will called it "currently the nation's most interesting and most important political journal." National Review described it as "one of the most interesting magazines in the United States."

Credit for its influence was often attributed to Kinsley, whose wit and critical sensibility were seen as enlivening, and Hertzberg, a writer for The New Yorker and speechwriter for Jimmy Carter.

Hertzberg and Kinsley alternated as editor and as the author of the magazine's lead column, "TRB from Washington." Its perspective was described as center-left in 1988.

A final ingredient that led to the magazine's increased stature in the 1980s was its "back of the book" or literary, cultural and arts pages, which were edited by Leon Wieseltier. Peretz discovered Wieseltier, then working at Harvard's Society of Fellows, and installed him in charge of the section. Wieseltier reinvented the section along the lines of The New York Review of Books and allowed his critics, many of them academics, to write longer, critical essays, instead of simple book reviews. Alterman calls the selection of Wieseltier "probably... Peretz's single most significant positive achievement" in running the magazine. Despite changes of other editors, Wieseltier remained as cultural editor. Under him the section was "simultaneously erudite and zestful," according to Alterman."

Sullivan editorship, 1991–1996 

In 1991, Andrew Sullivan, a 28-year-old gay, self-described conservative from Britain, became editor. He took the magazine in a somewhat more conservative direction, but the majority of writers remained liberal or neoliberal. Hertzberg soon left the magazine to return to The New Yorker. Kinsley left the magazine in 1996 to found the online magazine Slate.

In 1994, Sullivan invited Charles Murray to contribute a 10,000-word article, excerpted from his coauthored book The Bell Curve. The article, which contended that "African Americans score differently from whites on standardized tests of cognitive ability," proved to be very controversial and was published in a special issue together with many responses and critiques. The magazine also published a very critical article by Elizabeth McCaughey about the Clinton administration's health care plan. Alterman described the article as "dishonest, misinformed," and "the single most influential article published in the magazine during the entire Clinton presidency. James Fallows of The Atlantic noted the article's inaccuracies and said, "The White House issued a point-by-point rebuttal, which The New Republic did not run. Instead it published a long piece by McCaughey attacking the White House statement." Sullivan also published a number of pieces by Camille Paglia.

Ruth Shalit, a young writer for the magazine in the Sullivan years, was repeatedly criticized for plagiarism. After the Shalit scandals, the magazine began using fact-checkers during Sullivan's time as editor. One was Stephen Glass. When later working as a reporter, he was later found to have made up quotes, anecdotes, and facts in his own articles.

Kelly, Lane, Beinart, Foer, Just editorships, 1996–2012 

After Sullivan stepped down in 1996, David Greenberg and Peter Beinart served jointly as acting editors. After the 1996 election, Michael Kelly served as editor for a year. During his tenure as editor and afterward, Kelly, who also wrote the TRB column, was intensely critical of Clinton. Writer Stephen Glass, who had been a major contributor under Kelly's editorship, was later shown to have falsified and fabricated numerous stories, which was admitted by The New Republic after an investigation by Kelly's successor, Charles Lane. Kelly had consistently supported Glass during his tenure, including sending scathing letters to those challenging the veracity of Glass's stories. (The events were later dramatized in the feature film Shattered Glass, adapted from a 1998 report by H.G. Bissinger.)

Chuck Lane held the editor's position between 1997 and 1999. During Lane's tenure, the Stephen Glass scandal occurred. Peretz has written that Lane ultimately "put the ship back on its course," for which Peretz said he was "immensely grateful." Lane resigned after he learned that Peretz intended to replace him.

Peter Beinart, a third editor who took over when he was 28 years old, followed Lane. He served as editor from 1999 to 2006.

In the early 2000s, the TNR added Buzz weblogs &c., Iraq'd, and Easterblogg, replaced in 2005 with the sole blog The Plank. The Stump was added in 2007 and covered the 2008 presidential election.

The magazine remained well known, with references to it occasionally popping up in popular culture. Lisa Simpson was once portrayed as a subscriber to The New Republic for Kids. Matt Groening, the creator of The Simpsons''', once drew a cover for The New Republic. In the pilot episode of the HBO series Entourage, which first aired on July 18, 2004, Ari Gold asks Eric Murphy: "Do you read The New Republic? Well, I do, and it says that you don't know what the fuck you're talking about."

Franklin Foer took over from Beinart in March 2006. The magazine's first editorial under Foer said, "We've become more liberal.... We've been encouraging Democrats to dream big again on the environment and economics...." Foer is the brother of novelist Jonathan Safran Foer, author of Everything Is Illuminated (2002).

Other prominent writers who edited or wrote for the magazine in those years include senior editor and columnist Jonathan Chait, Lawrence F. Kaplan, John Judis and Spencer Ackerman.

 Political stances under Peretz The New Republic gradually became much less left-wing under Peretz, which culminated in the editorship of the conservative Andrew Sullivan. The magazine was associated with the Democratic Leadership Council (DLC) and "New Democrats," such as Bill Clinton and Joseph Lieberman, who received the magazine's endorsement in the 2004 Democratic primary.

In the 21st century, the magazine gradually shifted left but was still more moderate and hawkish than conventional liberal periodicals. Policies supported by both The New Republic and the DLC in the 1990s were increased funding for the Earned Income Tax Credit program, the reform of the federal welfare system, and supply-side economics, especially the idea of reducing higher marginal income tax rates, which in the later Peretz years received heavy criticism from senior editor Jonathan Chait.

 Foreign policy stances under Peretz The New Republic's support for Israel, including conservative right-wing or Likud stances of the state, was a strong theme of the magazine from the beginning: "Support for Israel is deep down an expression of America's best view of itself." According to the journalism professor Eric Alterman:

Nothing has been as consistent about the past 34 years of The New Republic as the magazine's devotion to Peretz's own understanding of what is good for Israel.... It is really not too much to say that almost all of Peretz's political beliefs are subordinate to his commitment to Israel's best interests, and these interests as Peretz defines them almost always involve more war.

Unsigned editorials prior to the 2003 invasion of Iraq expressed strong support for military action and cited the threat of facilities for weapons of mass destruction as well as humanitarian concerns. In the first years of the war, editorials were critical of the handling of the war but continued to justify the invasion on humanitarian grounds although they no longer maintained that Iraq's weapons of mass destruction posed any threat to the United States. In the November 27, 2006 issue, the editors wrote:

At this point, it seems almost beside the point to say this: The New Republic deeply regrets its early support for this war. The past three years have complicated our idealism and reminded us of the limits of American power and our own wisdom.

 Peretz sells remaining shares and buys magazine back from CanWest 

Until February 2007, The New Republic was owned by Martin Peretz, New York financiers Roger Hertog and Michael Steinhardt, and Canadian media conglomerate Canwest.

In late February 2007, Peretz sold his share of the magazine to CanWest, which announced that a subsidiary, CanWest Media Works International, had acquired a full interest in the publication. Peretz retained his position as editor-in-chief.

In March 2009, Peretz and a group of investors, led by the former Lazard executive Laurence Grafstein and including Michael Alter, bought the magazine back from CanWest, which was on the edge of bankruptcy. Frank Foer continued as editor and was responsible for the day-to-day management of the magazine, and Peretz remained editor-in-chief.

 New format 

Starting with the March 19, 2007 issue, the magazine implemented major changes:

 Decreased frequency: the magazine went to publishing twice a month, or 24 times a year. This replaced the old plan of publishing 44 issues a year. The magazine described its publication schedule as "biweekly," with specified "skipped publication dates." There were ten of these in 2010.
 New design and layout: Issues featured more visuals, new art and other "reader friendly" content. Warnock typeface throughout was accented by woodcut-style illustrations.
 More pages and bigger size: Issues became bigger and contained more pages.
 Improved paper: Covers and pages became sturdier.
 Increased newsstand price: Although the subscription prices did not change, the newsstand price increased from $3.95 to $4.95.
 Website redesign: The website offered more daily content and new features. Richard Just took over as editor of the magazine on December 8, 2010.

 Chris Hughes ownership and editorial crisis, 2012–2016 

On March 9, 2012, Chris Hughes, co-founder of Facebook, was introduced as the New Republic's majority owner and Editor-in-Chief. Under Hughes, the magazine became less focused on "The Beltway," with more cultural coverage and attention to visuals. It stopped running an editorial in every issue. Media observers noted a less uniformly pro-Israel tone in the magazine's coverage than its editorial stance during Peretz's ownership.

On December 4, 2014, Gabriel Snyder, previously of Gawker and Bloomberg, replaced Franklin Foer as editor. The magazine was reduced from twenty issues per year to ten and the editorial offices moved from Penn Quarter, Washington DC, to New York, where it was reinvented as a "vertically integrated digital-media company." The changes provoked a major crisis among the publication's editorial staff and contributing editors. The magazine's literary editor, Leon Wieseltier, resigned in protest. Subsequent days brought many more resignations, including those of executive editors Rachel Morris and Greg Veis; nine of the magazine's eleven active senior writers; legal-affairs editor Jeffrey Rosen; the digital-media editor; six culture writers and editors; and thirty-six out of thirty-eight contributing editors (including Paul Berman, Jonathan Chait, William Deresiewicz, Ruth Franklin, Anthony Grafton, Enrique Krauze, Ryan Lizza, Sacha Z. Scoblic, Helen Vendler, Sean Wilentz). In all, two-thirds of the names on the editorial masthead were gone.

The mass resignations forced the magazine to suspend its December 2014 edition. Previously a weekly for most of its history, it was immediately before suspension published ten times per year with a circulation of approximately 50,000. The company went back to publishing twenty issues a year, and editor Gabriel Snyder worked with staff to reshape it.

In the wake of the editorial crisis, Hughes indicated that he intended to stay with The New Republic over the long term, telling an NPR interviewer of his desire to make sure the magazine could produce quality journalism "hopefully for decades to come." He published an open letter about his "commitment" to give the magazine "a new mandate for a new century." However, on January 11, 2016, Hughes put The New Republic up for sale. In another open letter, he said, "After investing a great deal of time, energy, and over $20 million, I have come to the conclusion that it is time for new leadership and vision at The New Republic."

 Win McCormack ownership, 2016–present 

In February 2016, Win McCormack bought the magazine from Hughes and named Eric Bates, the former executive editor of Rolling Stone, as editor. In September 2017, Bates was demoted from his leadership role to a masthead title of "editor at large." J.J. Gould, coming from The Atlantic, then served as editor for just over a year, before resigning in December 2018. In November 2017, Hamilton Fish V, the publisher since McCormack's acquisition of the magazine, resigned amid allegations of workplace misconduct. Kerrie Gillis was named publisher in February 2019  and Chris Lehmann, formerly the editor in chief of The Baffler, was named editor April 9, 2019. Within months his management style faced public criticism for his hiring process of an Inequality Editor, posted on June 28. Within weeks, another scandal erupted, with Lehmann facing even harsher criticism from the public and the media for his decision to publish a controversial op-ed by Dale Peck called "My Mayor Pete Problem." The op-ed was retracted, with Lehmann commenting in a separate statement: "The New Republic recognizes that this post crossed a line, and while it was largely intended as satire, it was inappropriate and invasive." In March 2021, it was announced that Lehmann would be departing his role as editor and would be replaced by Michael Tomasky.

 Circulation 

 Print circulation in the 2000s The New Republics average paid circulation for 2009 was 53,485 copies per issue.The New Republics last reported circulation numbers to media auditor BPA Worldwide were for the six months ending on June 30, 2009.

 Online 

According to Quantcast, the TNR website received roughly 120,000 visitors in April 2008, and 962,000 visitors in April 2012.  By June 9, 2012, the TNR website's monthly page visits dropped to 421,000 in the U.S. and 521,000 globally.  As of April 16, 2014, the TNR website's Quantcast webpage contains the following messages: "This publisher has not implemented Quantcast Measurement. Data is estimated and not verified by Quantcast...," and "We do not have enough information to provide a traffic estimate...," and "Traffic data unavailable until this site becomes quantified."  Demographically, data show that visitors tend to be well educated (76% being college graduates, with 33% having a graduate degree), relatively affluent (55% having a household income of over $60,000 and 31% having a six figure income), white (83%), and more likely to be male (61%). Eighty two percent were at least 35 years old with 38% being over the age of 50.

 Controversies 

 Michael Straight New Republic editor Michael Whitney Straight (1948 to 1956) was later discovered to be a spy for the KGB, recruited into the same network as Donald Maclean, Guy Burgess, Kim Philby, and Anthony Blunt. Straight's espionage activities began at Cambridge during the 1930s; he later claimed that they ceased during World War II. Later, shortly before serving in the Kennedy administration, he revealed his past ties and turned in fellow spy Anthony Blunt. In return for his cooperation, his own involvement was kept secret and he continued to serve in various capacities for the US Government until he retired. Straight admitted his involvement in his memoirs; however, subsequent documents obtained from the former KGB after the fall of the Soviet Union indicated that he drastically understated the extent of his espionage activities.

 Ruth Shalit plagiarism 

In 1995, writer Ruth Shalit was fired for repeated incidents of plagiarism and an excess of factual errors in her articles.

 Stephen Glass scandal 

In 1998, features writer Stephen Glass was revealed in a Forbes Digital investigation to have fabricated a story called "Hack Heaven". A TNR investigation found that most of Glass's stories had used or been based on fabricated information. The story of Glass's fall and TNR editor Chuck Lane's handling of the scandal was dramatized in the 2003 film Shattered Glass, based on a 1998 article in Vanity Fair.

 Lee Siegel 

In 2006, long-time contributor, critic, and senior editor Lee Siegel, who had maintained a blog on the TNR site dedicated primarily to art and culture, was revealed by an investigation to have collaborated in posting comments to his own blog under an alias aggressively praising Siegel, attacking his critics and claiming not to be Lee Siegel when challenged by an anonymous detractor on his blog. The blog was removed from the website and Siegel was suspended from writing for the print magazine. He resumed writing for TNR in April 2007. Siegel was also controversial for his coinage "blogofascists" which he applied to "the entire political blogosphere", though with an emphasis on leftwing or center-left bloggers such as Daily Kos and Atrios.

 Spencer Ackerman 

In 2006, associate editor Spencer Ackerman was fired by editor Franklin Foer. Describing it as a "painful" decision, Foer attributed the firing to Ackerman's "insubordination": disparaging the magazine on his personal blog, saying that he would "skullfuck" a terrorist's corpse at an editorial meeting if that was required to "establish his anti-terrorist bona fides and sending Foer an e-mail where he said—in what according to Ackerman was intended to be a joke—he would "make a niche in your skull" with a baseball bat. Ackerman, by contrast, argued that the dismissal was due to "irreconcilable ideological differences." He believed that his leftward drift as a result of the Iraq War and the actions of the Bush administration was not appreciated by the senior editorial staff. Within 24 hours of being fired by The New Republic, Ackerman was hired as a senior correspondent for a rival magazine, The American Prospect.

 Scott Thomas Beauchamp controversy 

In July 2007, after The New Republic published an article by an American soldier in Iraq titled "Shock Troops", allegations of inadequate fact-checking were leveled against the magazine. Critics alleged that the piece contained inconsistent details indicative of fabrication. The identity of the anonymous soldier, Scott Thomas Beauchamp, was revealed. Beauchamp was married to Elspeth Reeve, one of the magazine's three fact-checkers. As a result of the controversy, The New Republic and the United States Army launched investigations, reaching different conclusions.Story, Louise (July 24, 2007). "Doubts Raised by 'Baghdad Diarist' ". The New York Times. In an article titled "The Fog of War", published on December 1, 2007, Franklin Foer wrote that the magazine could no longer stand behind the stories written by Beauchamp.

 Pete Buttigieg article 

On July 12, 2019, gay writer Dale Peck wrote an article for The New Republic critical of Pete Buttigieg, a 2020 Democratic Party presidential primary candidate, in which he repeatedly referred to Buttigieg as "Mary Pete", which he described as the "gay equivalent of Uncle Tom", saying, "Pete and I are just not the same kind of gay." The article went on to describe the candidate as a "fifteen-year-old boy in a Chicago bus station wondering if it's a good idea to go home with a fifty-year-old man so that he'll finally understand what he is." The piece was harshly received by some media figures and the center of controversy.

 Editors 

 Herbert Croly (1914–1930)
 Bruce Bliven (1930–1946)
 Henry A. Wallace (1946–1948)
 Michael Straight (1948–1956)
 Gilbert A. Harrison (1956–1975)
 Martin Peretz (1975–1979)
 Michael Kinsley (1979–1981; 1985–1989)
 Hendrik Hertzberg (1981–1985; 1989–1991)
 Andrew Sullivan (1991–1996)
 Michael Kelly (1996–1997)
 Charles Lane (1997–1999)
 Peter Beinart (1999–2006)
 Franklin Foer (2006–2010; 2012–2014)
 Richard Just (2010–2012)
 Gabriel Snyder (2014–2016)
 Eric Bates (2016–2017)
 J.J. Gould (2017–2018)
 Chris Lehmann (2019–2021)
 Michael Tomasky (2021–Present)

Before Wallace's appointment in 1946, the masthead listed no single editor in charge but gave an editorial board of four to eight members. Walter Lippmann, Edmund Wilson, and Robert Morss Lovett, among others, served on this board at various times. The names given above are the first editor listed in each issue, always the senior editor of the team.

 Notable contributors 

 1910s–1940s 

 Eugene Szekeres Bagger, author and essayist
 Ralph Bates, English writer and political activist
 John Dewey, essayist and philosopher
 W. E. B. Du Bois, writer, professor and sociologist
 Otis Ferguson, film critic
 John T. Flynn, essayist and New Deal critic
 Learned Hand, Judge
 John Maynard Keynes, economist
 Clara Littledale, writer on home and family life
 George Henry Soule Jr., labor economist
 Agnes de Lima, lead writer on education
 Thomas Mann, "Letter to Alexey Tolstoy (sent to Russia through Russian War Relief Inc.)" (1943)
 George Orwell, author and essayist
 Virginia Woolf, author and essayist
 Edmund Wilson, assistant book reviewer

 1943–1983 

 John Beecher, contributing writer
 Richard Strout, correspondent, The Christian Science Monitor, "TRB From Washington"
 Stark Young, drama critic, scholar, novelist, painter, contributing writer.

 1950s–1970s 

 Stanley Kauffmann, film critic (1958–2013)
 Reinhold Niebuhr, theologian
 L. Fletcher Prouty, former Chief of Special Operations for the Joint Chiefs of Staff
 Roger Rosenblatt
 Philip Roth, author
 Judd L. Teller, author, editor, poet
 Philip Terzian, author/editor

 1980s–1990s 

 Fred Barnes
 Eric Breindel
 Jeane Kirkpatrick
 Jacob Heilbrunn
 Irving Howe
 Robert Kagan
 Morton Kondracke
 Charles Krauthammer
 Irving Kristol
 Edward Luttwak
 Michael Ledeen
 Joshua Muravchik
 Ronald Radosh

 1990s–present 

 Fouad Ajami, professor of Middle East Studies at Johns Hopkins University
 Scott Thomas Beauchamp, freelance writer, soldier
 Paul Berman, essayist, author
 Simon Blackburn, English philosopher
 Alan Brinkley, historian
 Jonathan Chait, senior editor
 Jonathan Cohn, senior editor
 Jerry Coyne, evolutionary biologist
 Michael Crowley, senior editor
 E. J. Dionne Jr., journalist
 Barbara Ehrenreich, journalist
 Niall Ferguson, historian
 William Galston, political philosopher
 Stephen Glass, reporter fired by TNR for submitting fabricated stories, dramatized in the 2003 film Shattered Glass J.J. Gould, Canadian-American journalist
 David Grann, senior editor
 Melissa Gira Grant, writer
 David Greenberg, historian and journalist
 Blaine Greteman, professor at University of Iowa
 Matt Groening, illustrator and The Simpsons creator
 Jacob Hacker, political scientist
 Johann Hari, British writer
 David Hazony, Israeli writer
 Jeet Heer, Canadian writer
Julia Ioffe (born 1982), Russian-born American journalist
 John Judis, essayist
 Tony Judt, historian
 Jo Livingstone, culture staff writer
 Suki Kim, contributing editor
 Adam Kirsch, poet and critic
 Alvaro Vargas Llosa, writer
 John McWhorter, linguist and political commentator
 Dana Milbank, senior editor
 Sherwin B. Nuland, medical doctor and author
 Michael Oren, historian and author
 Camille Paglia, essayist
 Alex Pareene, former editor of Gawker Dale Peck, literary reviewer
 George Pelecanos, author
 Caryl Phillips, writer
 Steven Pinker, cognitive linguist and Harvard professor
 David Plotz, editor of Slate Richard Rorty, philosopher
 Richard Posner, federal judge
 Hanna Rosin, senior editor
 Noam Scheiber, senior editor
 Amartya Sen, economist
 Alex Shephard, news editor

 Lee Siegel, cultural critic
 Zadie Smith, writer
 Joseph Stiglitz, economist
 Richard Taruskin, musicologist
 Helen Vendler, literary critic
 Michael Walzer, philosopher, essayist, author
 Alan Wolfe, political scientist/ sociologist
 Gordon S. Wood, historian
 James Wood, English literary critic
 Robert Wright, journalist; former TNR senior editor and columnist

 References 

 Citations 

 Primary sources 

 Groff Conklin, ed. New Republic Anthology: 1914–1935, 1936.
 Cowley, Malcolm. And I Worked at the Writer's Trade, 1978.
 Wickenden, Dorothy (1994). The New Republic Reader. 

 Secondary sources 

 Mott, Frank L. A History of American Magazines. Vol. 3. Harvard University Press, 1960.
 Seideman, David. The New Republic: A Voice of Modern Liberalism, 1986
 Steel, Ronald. Walter Lippmann and the American Century'', 1980

External links 

 
 The New Republic Online, offering online subscription

 
Political magazines published in the United States
1914 establishments in Washington, D.C.
Modern liberal magazines published in the United States
News magazines published in the United States
Weekly magazines published in the United States
Magazines established in 1914
Magazines published in Washington, D.C.
Ten times annually magazines